The Khedivial Opera House or Royal Opera House ( / ALA-LC: Dār Awbirā al-Khudaywī) was an opera house in Cairo, Egypt, the oldest opera house in all of Africa. It was inaugurated on 1 November 1869 and burned down on 28 October  1971.

The opera house was built on the orders of the Khedive Ismail to celebrate the opening of the Suez Canal.  The architects Pietro Avoscani (from Livorno) and Rossi designed the building.  It seated approximately 850 people and was made mostly of wood.  It was located between the districts of Azbakeya and Ismailyya in Egypt's capital city.

Verdi's opera Rigoletto was the first opera performed at the opera house on 1 November 1869.  Ismail planned a grander exhibition for his new theatre.  After months of delay due to the outbreak of the Franco-Prussian War, Verdi's new opera, Aida, received its world premiere at the Khedivial Opera House on 24 December 1871.

In the early morning hours of 28 October 1971, the opera house burned to the ground.  The all-wooden building was quickly consumed, and only two statues made by Mohamed Hassan survived.

After the original opera house was destroyed, Cairo was without an opera house for nearly two decades until the opening of the new Cairo Opera House in 1988.

The site of the Khedivial Opera House has been rebuilt into a multi-story concrete car garage. The square (to the south of Al Ataba metro station) overlooking the building's location, is still called Opera Square (Meidan El Opera)

See also
Cairo Opera House

External links

History from the website of the new Cairo Opera House
Press release from the Egyptian Cultural Center

Buildings and structures in Cairo
Culture in Cairo
History of Cairo
Opera houses in Egypt
Theatres completed in 1869
Music venues completed in 1869
1971 disestablishments
1869 establishments in Egypt
19th-century architecture in Egypt